Marlboro is an unincorporated community in Frederick County, Virginia, United States. It is located at the intersection of Middle Road (VA 628) and Cedar Creek Grade (VA 622) on Cedar Creek. Marlboro was originally known as Marlborough and Marlboroughtown.

References

Unincorporated communities in Frederick County, Virginia
Unincorporated communities in Virginia